Toys in the Attic (festival title: In the Attic or Who Has a Birthday Today?) is a 2009 internationally co-produced stop-motion animated fantasy film directed by Jiří Barta and written by Edgar Dutka and Barta which depicts a community of toys and other objects in an attic who come to life when no human is around. It is an international co-production between the Czech Republic, France, Japan and Slovakia. The film was released first in the Czech Republic on 5 March 2009 and has been shown subtitled at film festivals internationally. An American English dub – adapted, produced and directed by Vivian Schilling and performed by actors including Forest Whitaker, Joan Cusack, Cary Elwes  and Schilling herself – has been recorded, which the film was first shown with on 3 March 2012 at the New York International Children's Film Festival and was released nationally on 24 August 2012 by Hannover House.

Plot 
In an attic full of discarded junk, a pretty doll called Buttercup lives in an old trunk together with her friends, the marionette Sir Handsome, the lovable Teddy Bear, a Mechanical Mouse and the plasticine creature, Laurent. When Buttercup is snatched and taken off to the Land of Evil, her pals set out on a wondrous and daring adventure to rescue her from the all-powerful Head of State. Originally produced in Czech, the meticulously crafted animated feature is set in a magical world of toys and knick-knacks stored in the attic of a home in Prague. Following the symbolism of the Cold War era that impacted director Barta and the Czech Republic, the world of the attic is divided into the land of happy toys in the west and the land of evil in the east. The despotic Head of State rules over the evil empire of the east with a band of sinister minions, insects and rotted vegetables.

Czech Cast 
Bára Dlouhá as Paní Na Ulici
Barbora Hrzánová as Myška Sklodowská
Boris Hybner as Mucha
Vladimír Javorský as Rytíř Krasoň
Nada Konvalinková as Služebná Růženka
Johana Krticková as Holčička - Hlas
Věra Kubánková as Babička - Hlas
Jirí Lábus as Hlava / Vládce Říše Zla
Petr Nározný as Kocour Baron
Lucie Pernetová as Panenka Pomněnka
Ivan Trojan as Skřítek Šubrt
Miroslav Táborský as Doktor Skarab
Ludmila Ungrichtová as Babička
Andrea Zádníková as Holčička

English Dub Cast 

 Forest Whitaker as Teddy
 Joan Cusack as Madam Curie
 Vivian Schilling as Buttercup
 Cary Elwes as Sir Handsome
 Marcelo Tubert as Laurent
 Douglas Urbanski as Head
 Rico Simonini as Tomcat
 Jo Ellison as Rosie

Production 
Jiří Barta and Edgar Dutka wrote the script, originally titled Whose Birthday is it Today before it was renamed Toys in the Attic, from 1998 to 2000 with the intention of creating a story that was family-orientated, sellable to producers, and having elements of a child's imagination: "When I found an old exercise book with my drawing of a train made from old train tickets with a piece of cigarette for the smokestack, the kid in my imagination reappeared.  Edgar and I remembered the games we used to play in strange forbidden places we found in our attics."

Due to very short deadlines set by the producer, multiple stages of making Toys in the Attic, including pre-production, production, and post-production, happened at the same time. The film was made by a total of ten to fifteen of Prague art school graduates and Barta's colleagues and friends. Pre-production began in January 2007; it involved not only storyboarding but also creating the puppets and sets from a "huge amount of junk and antique stuff." The filming and animation took place from June 2007 to September 2008, which the final product contains 1,200 stills; and post-production was finished by early 2009.

The main part of the film's animation is that of puppets animated by stop motion but there are also examples of clay animation in the character Šubrt and the objects of his room, special effects such as steam in traditional animation and the face of the plaster bust Hlava ("Head") was performed in pixilation and voiced in the original Czech audio by actor Jiří Lábus.

Release 
The film was theatrically released on 5 March 2009 by CinemArt and was premiered at the New York International Children's Film Festival. It was also released on DVD, VOD and Blu-ray on November 23, 2009 by Magic Box.

Reception 
CinemaArt released the film in the Czech Republic on 6 March 2009. Peter Debruge compared the film to Toy Story in a reviews for Variety, and complimented the animation: "despite their inflexible faces, Barta conceives all sorts of inventive ways to bring these inanimate objects to life. […] Should a given shot prove too tricky to accomplish practically, Barta has no qualms about using digital compositing to blend multiple stop-motion plates. Though rudimentary, fire and water effects are especially effective." About the film's commercial prospects, Debruge wrote: "For all its charms, In the Attic feels vaguely sinister and may prove too intense for younger kids – a testament to the film's pacing and score, as well as how deeply auds emotionally connect with these occasionally macabre toy characters." The film has been honored with awards including an Excellence Prize for animation at the 2010 Japan Media Arts Festival, those for best feature at the 2010 New York International Children's Film Festival and the 2011 Tehran International Animation Festival, in both winning over The Secret of Kells, and the Kecskemét City Award at the 7th Festival of European Animated Feature Films and TV Specials in 2011. The film has a 70% on Rotten Tomatoes.

Awards

References

External links 
 
 
 
 Behind the scenes photographs at Bio Illusion

2009 films
2000s children's fantasy films
Czech animated films
Films about dolls
Films about toys
Films directed by Jiří Barta
Films about sentient toys
2000s stop-motion animated films
Czech Lion Awards winners (films)
2009 animated films
Films based on fairy tales
Czech animated fantasy films